Jennifer R. Terrasa (born June 6, 1969) is a Democratic member of the Maryland House of Delegates. She was previously a member of the Howard County Council from 2006 to 2018.

Early life and career
Terrasa was born on June 6, 1969, in New York City. Her family moved to Columbia, Maryland when she was a toddler, where she graduated from Oakland Mills High School. She attended the University of Maryland at College Park in College Park, Maryland, where she earned a B.A. degree in sociology in 1992, and the University of Baltimore School of Law, where she earned a J.D. degree in law review in 1997. She was admitted to the Maryland Bar in the same year. While at the University of Baltimore, she met her husband Gabriel.

After graduating, she served as a law clerk to Maryland Court of Appeals judge Howard S. Chasanow until 1998 and Howard County Circuit Court judge Lenore R. Gelfman until 1999. From 2000 to 2006, Terrasa served as a family law hotline attorney for the Women's Law Center of Maryland.

Howard County Council
In 1994, Terrasa and her husband moved to the Kings Contrivance neighborhood of Columbia. She was appointed to the neighborhood's Village Board in December 2001, succeeding Victoria Dieringer, who resigned for personal reasons. She resigned from the Village Board in December 2005 to run for the Howard County Council, seeking to succeed councilmember Guy Guzzone, who announced plans to run for the Maryland House of Delegates. She won the general election with 62.0 percent of the vote.

Terrasa was a national delegate for Barack Obama at the 2008 Democratic National Convention. Before the 2008 Maryland Democratic presidential primary, Terrasa canvassed alongside county council member Calvin Ball III in Oakland Mills for Obama.

Terrasa faced a tough re-election campaign in 2010, facing off against Republican moderate Dennis R. Schrader in the general election. She defeated Schrader in the general election, receiving 67.1 percent of the vote.

In January 2018, Terrasa declared her candidacy for the Maryland House of Delegates, seeking to succeed delegate Frank Turner. who announced plans to retire at the end of his term. Turner endorsed Terrasa's campaign in January 2018. She won the Democratic primary with 27.7 percent of the vote, coming in third out of a field of four Democrats. She won the general election with 27.1 percent of the vote, defeating Republican Chris Yates.

In the legislature
Terrasa was sworn into the Maryland House of Delegates on January 9, 2019.

In February 2022, House Speaker Adrienne A. Jones assigned Terrasa and Vaughn Stewart to lead the newly-created Progressive Policy Forum within the House Democratic Caucus.

Committee assignments
 Member, Environment and Transportation Committee, 2019–present (housing & real property subcommittee, 2020–present; land use & ethics subcommittee, 2020–present; local government & bi-county agencies subcommittee, 2020–present)
 Member, Appropriations Committee, 2019 (health & social services subcommittee, 2019; oversight committee on personnel, 2019)

Other memberships
 Member, Maryland Legislative Latino Caucus, 2019–present
 Maryland Legislative Transit Caucus, 2019–present
 Women Legislators of Maryland, 2019–present

Political positions

Elections
Terrasa, alongside Howard County Council chairman Jon Weinstein, introduced legislation in February 2016 that would create a public financing system for candidates who swear off large donations. The legislation was reintroduced in 2017.

Environment
In March 2021, Terrasa, alongside Delegates Lorig Charkoudian, Dana Stein, and Vaughn Stewart, joined the Leaders for Climate Accountability, a national work of public officials who support holding corporate polluters accountable for their contributions to the climate crisis. She introduced legislation in the 2021 legislative session that would allow the Attorney General of Maryland to sue companies that have contributed to the climate crisis through fraud or deception. The bill was reintroduced in the 2022 legislative session.

Healthcare
Terrasa supports universal health care and Medicare for All. She co-sponsored the Healthy Maryland Act of 2019, which would institute Medicare-for-all, single-payer healthcare legislation in Maryland.

Housing
In October 2015, Terrasa introduced legislation that would require 15 percent of all new housing units developed in downtown Columbia to be affordable to families earning between 40 and 80 percent of the county's median income.

In October 2018, Terrasa introduced a bill that would require new single-family houses and apartments to have infrastructure to support charging stations for electric vehicles.

Immigration
Following the election of President-elect Donald Trump, Terrasa introduced legislation that would designate Howard County a sanctuary jurisdiction.

Marijuana
Terrasa supports the legalization and regulation of recreational marijuana.

Redistricting
Terrasa supports using an independent redistricting commission to draw Maryland's legislative and congressional district maps.

Taxes
In July 2018, Terrasa introduced legislation that would repeal Howard County's tax on mobile home rental sites. The County Council voted to kill the bill in September 2018.

Electoral history

References

Living people
Democratic Party members of the Maryland House of Delegates
University of Maryland, College Park alumni
University of Baltimore School of Law alumni
21st-century American politicians
1969 births
21st-century American women politicians
County officials in Maryland
Politicians from New York City
Women state legislators in Maryland
County commissioners in Maryland